Ruby Ibarra (born February 25, 1988) is an American rapper, music producer, and spoken word artist from San Lorenzo, California. She raps in Tagalog, Waray, and English. Her raps concern her cultural heritage and her experiences as an immigrant to the United States from the Philippines.

Early life
Ibarra was born in the Philippines. Ruby spent around four years of her life in the city of Tacloban, she was inspired by a television performance by Filipino rapper Francis Magalona. Her family immigrated to San Lorenzo, California, and she was raised in the Bay Area. She attended the University of California, Davis and performed with spoken word collective, SickSpits. Ruby attributes her identity in music from growing up in the early nineties with hip-hop influences of Tupac, Eminem, Wu-Tang Clan, etc.

Music career
Ibarra released her Lost In Translation mixtape, hosted by DJ Kay Slay, on December 12, 2012. The mixtape debuted that evening on Eminem's Shade45 channel on Sirius XM Radio, where she was interviewed live by DJ Kay Slay.

On November 5, 2015, she officially signed to independent record label, Beatrock Music, and announced that she would release her full-length debut album with them in 2016. She began recording the album with Fatgums in Inglewood, California, in March 2016. On October 3, 2017, she released her album “Circa 1991” where she documents social justice issues like immigration and trauma, and she made her mark in her local music industry. She is described by people as reflective of who they are and the experiences they’ve had in the United States.

In January 2018, Ruby was featured in a national MasterCard TV commercial with singer SZA and other breakout artists to promote the Start Something Priceless campaign.

In 2018, Ruby Ibarra has done 6 projects with The Filipino Channel: Cinematografo: Performance and Music Licensing- Discovering Routes: Music Licensing- Kasayahan Festival in Daly City: Performance- 24x24: Feature not yet released- Balitang America: Jocelyn Enriquez x Ruby Ibarra Feature- Gifts of Love: Performance for ABS CBN Foundation. Ruby Ibarra’s 2018 documentary - Nothing on US: Pinays Rising - was featured in multiple countries and film festivals including Guam, Toronto, San Francisco, and Boston.

On June 29, 2019, Ibarra performed at the Smithsonian Folklife Festival alongside DJ Mister REY on the National Mall in Washington, D.C. Ibarra performed at The Getty on February 15, 2020, in collaboration with the Smithsonian Folklife Festival. On August 29, 2021, Ibarra performed at A Night of "Pinoy"tainment! at John Anson Ford Amphitheatre in Los Angeles

In addition to Ruby’s individual platforms, she has team support from the following platforms to distribute her content: Myx TV (CableTv & Online broadcast in more than 15 million households on cable providers such as Comcast, Time Warner, Cox, Bright House and DIRECTV) and DASH Radio (a global digital radio broadcasting platform with more than 80 original stations and 10 million+ listeners around the world).

Ibarra has 45,400 subscribers on Youtube and combined presence of nearly 3 million views on YouTube.

Recent partnerships & features include the following corporations:

 Pandora 
 Apple 
 Reebok
 Forbes (Mastercard)
 BuzzFeed 
 VICE
 NBC News
 NPR
Ibarra's song "Us," featuring Rocky Rivera, Klassy and Faith Santilla, can be found in the video game NBA 2K23.

Style
Ibarra describes her style as reminiscent of 1990s hip hop; she cites Lupe Fiasco and Raekwon as her influences.

Personal life

Ibarra is a UC Davis graduate. She lives in Hayward and previously worked as a scientist in the quality-control department of a Bay Area biotech firm.

Discography

Albums
 Circa91 (Beatrock Music, October 3, 2017)

EPs
 Lost in Translation mixtape (Independent, December 2012)

Videography
 2018: Here
 2018: Us
 2019: Taking Names

See also
 Filipino hip hop

References

External links
 

Living people
American spoken word artists
University of California, Davis alumni
People from Tacloban
Musicians from Leyte (province)
People from San Lorenzo, California
Filipino women rappers
1988 births
American rappers of Filipino descent
American rappers of Asian descent
Rappers from California
Musicians from the San Francisco Bay Area
21st-century American women singers
21st-century American singers